The University of Haripur (UOH) is a public university situated in Haripur, Khyber Pakhtunkhwa, Pakistan.

History 
UOH was established in March 2008 as a Haripur campus of Hazara University. The campus was upgraded to full-fledged University of Haripur (UOH) in 2012 by the Government of Khyber Pakhtunkhwa.

Faculties and departments 
The university currently has the following departments and faculties.

Faculty of Social and Administrative Sciences 
Department of Economics
Department of Education
Department of Islamic and Religious Studies
Department of Management Sciences
Department of Psychology

Faculty of Basic and Applied Sciences 
Department of Information Technology
Department of Agriculture Sciences
 Department of history & Education
 Department of Islamic and religious studies
Department of Environmental Sciences
Department of Forestry and Wildlife Management
Department of Linguistics
Department of Geology
Department of Medical Lab Technology
Department of Microbiology
Department of Public Health
Department of Agronomy
Department of Entomology
Department of Pure and Applied Mathematics
Department of Food Science and Technology 
Allied Section

Academic programs 
UOH currently offers the following courses.

BS (4 years) 
 BS Artificial intelligence
 BS Computer Science
 BS Software Engineering
 BS Data Science (to be inaugurated soon)
 BS Telecom and networking
 BS Accounting and Finance
 BS Economics
 BS Environmental Science
 BS Education
 BS Psychology
 BS Medical Lab Technology (Diagnostic and Research Center)
 BS Geology
 BS Forestry and Wildlife
 BS Physics
 BS Chemistry 
 BS Food science
 BS health and physical education
 BS Biochemistry
 BS Botany
 BS Zoology
 BS Public Health
 BS English  
 BS History
 BS Food Science and Technology

Masters (2 years) 
 MBA
 MCS (Computer Science)
 MSc Economics
 MSc Environmental Sciences
 MSc Agriculture Sciences
 MEd (Education)
 MSc Psychology
 MSc Medical Lab Technology (Diagnostic and Research Center)
 MSc Microbiology
 MSc Public Health

MPhil and PhD 
 MPhil and PhD (Environmental Sciences)
 MPhil and PhD (Microbiology)
 MPhil and PhD (information technology)
 PhD (Agricultural Sciences; i.e. Agronomy, Entomology, Food Science and Technology, Horticulture, Plant Breeding and Genetics (PBG), Soil and Environmental Sciences)
 MPhil and PhD (Education)
 MPhil (Forestry and Wild Life)
 MPhil (Islamic and Religious Studies)

See also 
 Hazara University
 Abbottabad University of Science and Technology
 Government Post Graduate College Haripur

References

External links
 UOH official website
 UOH Facebook

2008 establishments in Pakistan
Educational institutions established in 2008
Public universities and colleges in Khyber Pakhtunkhwa
Haripur District